Batang Samarahan Bridge is a bridge connecting Kota Samarahan and Asajaya in Sarawak, Malaysia. The  bridge replaced the ferry service across Batang Samarahan/Sabang river.

The bridge opened for a trial run in May 2018, before opening permanently in June 2018.

References 

Bridges in Sarawak